Kala Doriya is a Pakistani romance comedy drama television series that was first broadcast on Hum TV on 16 September 2022. It is produced by Momina Duraid under banner MD Productions. It is written by Saima Akram Chaudhry and directed by Danish Nawaz. The series stars an ensemble of Sana Javed, Osman Khalid Butt, Nadia Afgan, Zainab Qayyum, Adla Khan, Shahzad Noor, Samina Ahmed, and Khalid Anam.

First announced in early 2021, the show got delayed due to writer's other projects, mainly Ramadan series.

Plot
Kaala Doriya revolves around the lives of Mahnoor and Asfand, played by Sana Javed and Osman Khalid Butt, respectively. There is no love between their families, and they are constantly fighting. They are both students at the same college and have a habit of teasing each other constantly.
Asfand and Mahnoor’s fight turned out to be an interesting bond that they developed between them. In the end, they eventually fall in love with each other. However, this news is shocking for their families, since they cannot even comprehend the magnitude of this news.
This is a love story angle that is sure to capture everyone’s attention.

Cast 
 Osman Khalid Butt as Asfandyar Munir aka Asfi
 Sana Javed as Mahnoor Shuja aka Mano
 Nadia Afgan as Mrs. Tehniyat Shuja Ahmed aka Tanno
 Shahzad Noor as Faraz, Asfand's brother
 Samina Ahmed as Tabassum Jahan  (Grandmother)
 Adla Khan as Nida Shuja Faraz (Faraz Wife)
 Khalid Anam as Mr Ikhtiar Ahmed (Grandfather)
 Zainab Qayyum as Mrs Saleeqa Munir Ahmed
 Farhan Ally Agha as Munir (Asfand & Faraz father)
 Saife Hassan as Professor Hammad (Asfand & Mahnoor University Professor)
Sohail Sameer as Shuja (Mahnoor & Nida father)
Taimoor Akbar as Gohar (Mahnoor Shuja and Asfandyar Munir College Fellows
Khalid Malik as Kabir (Kuku Mamu) Tanno Brother & Mahnoor and Nida Uncle. Batool Husband
Tamkenat Mansoor as Batool (Bitto Apa)- Kabir Wife
Shareef Baloch as SHO

Production

Development 
After the success of her 2021 Ramadan television series Chupke Chupke, screenwriter Saima Akram Chaudhry revealed that her next series is titled Kala Doriya which will not be broadcast in Ramadan. In September 2021, it confirmed that Sana Javed and Farhan Saeed has been selected to portray the leading roles and Amin Iqbal, the director of Ishq-e-Laa will direct the series. The pre-production work on the series began in late 2020 but release in 2022 due to Chaudhry's other projects with production house including Chupke Chupke and Hum Tum.

Casting 
In March 2022, it reported that Usman Mukhtar has joined the cast by replacing Saeed. However, Saeed again joined the cast when Mukhtar had to opt out of the project due to some of his personal reasons. In June 2022, the project was underwent some major changes with Ali Rehman Khan replaced Saeed and director Amin Iqbal was replaced by Danish Nawaz. In same month, Nadia Afgan also joined the cast. In late July, it reported that male lead has changed again, and Osman Khalid Butt has replaced Khan who will make his second collaboration with Javed after Goya. In the same month, Afgan revealed that the character she is playing is almost similar to Shahana, the character she played in Suno Chanda and its sequel.

Release 
The first and second teasers were released on 7 September 2022.

Reception 
The show launched on 16 September, every Friday at 8:00pm. The first episode received mixed reviews from the audience, some of them comparing it with previous Ramadan Plays of HUM TV.
The drama started with lower TRPs but later achieved high ratings, up to 7 of 9th episode.

Ratings

References 

Pakistani television series
2022 Pakistani television series debuts